Synopsis of Pure Mathematics is a book by G. S. Carr, written in 1886. The book attempted to summarize the state of most of the basic mathematics known at the time.

The book is noteworthy because it was a major source of information for the legendary and self-taught mathematician Srinivasa Ramanujan who managed to obtain a library loaned copy from a friend in 1903. Ramanujan reportedly studied the contents of the book in detail. The book is generally acknowledged as a key element in awakening the genius of Ramanujan.

Carr acknowledged the main sources of his book in its preface:

Bibliography

References

External links
 - archive.org
 - archive.org
 - rarebooksocietyofindia.org 

Mathematics books